The Hickstead Derby Bank known as the Derby Bank is an infamous jump at the All England Jumping Course at Hickstead that is part of the course for the British Jumping Derby. The jump has  rails on top, the smallest on the course, and then  horizontal flat before a  slope down the front, followed by 2 strides and a rail jump. It is the highest competition bank in the world.

The All England Jumping Course first opened in 1960 with the Derby bank added a year later in 1961. He wanted the Derby to be the ultimate test for horse and rider. Bunn arrived on New Year's Eve when it was snowing, and went round the showground measuring fences much to the bemusement of the show's officials. It is thought the layer of snow on top of the Hamburg bank might have affected Douglas's measurements or he chose to go better than his German counterparts as Hickstead's bank stands  taller than the German original, it is the highest competition bank in the world.

The original bank was predominately built of chalk with a layer of clay encasing it. Many of the riders in the first Hickstead Derby refused to jump the obstacle fearing it too dangerous and a risk for their horses. Ireland's Seamus Hayes became the first rider to win the Hickstead Derby after successfully negotiating the bank on his horse, Goodbye III. The internal structure was changed to concrete in 1969, and first used in competition in 1970. This was deemed safer and reduced slipping during the descent. Work was completed in 2005 to lessen the angle of the bank's face from 52 degrees to 60 degrees. At the time, Bunn said the "changes have been made simply because less horses are educated in the hunting field, where this type of obstacle is met". Despite the changes, there is still only an average of only one clear round per year at the Hickstead Derby.

References

Show jumping events
Equestrian sports in the United Kingdom
Equestrian sports in England
Sports venues in West Sussex
Show jumping venues